Thieffry can refer to:

 Edmond Thieffry (1892–1929), Belgian First World War air ace and aviation pioneer
 Jacques Thieffry (1924–2006), French field hockey player
 Thieffry metro station, Brussels